"Princess line" or "princess dress" describes a woman's fitted dress or other garment cut in long panels without a horizontal join or separation at the waist. Instead of relying on darts to shape the garment, the fit is achieved with long seams ("princess seams") and shaped pattern pieces. A rarely used alternative name for the Princess line was French-dart-line dress.

History

19th century
The princess line is popularly associated with Charles Frederick Worth who first introduced it in the early 1870s. It was named in honour of the famously elegant Princess Alexandra. By the late 1870s and early 1880s the Princess dress was a popular style. It is considered one of the first "bodycon" (body-conscious) fashions due to its extremely closely fitted design, presenting the figure in a natural (or at least, corseted) form undistorted by either crinoline or bustle. 'Princess-line polonaises' were worn over long underskirts. The Princess line was also popular for young girls, who wore it with a sash or, if slightly older, over a longer underskirt.

20th century
The Princess line was a staple of dress design and construction throughout the century. In 1951 the couturier Christian Dior presented a princess-line based fashion collection which is sometimes called the 'Princess Line,' although its official name was Ligne Longue or 'Long Line'.

21st century
The Princess line remains a popular style for wedding dresses and a design staple for both day and evening dresses. More recently, the design principle has been consciously applied to men's garments, which generally do not have waist seams anyway.

See also 

 Princess seams

References

19th-century fashion
20th-century fashion
21st-century fashion
Dresses